The Z-89 is a personal computer produced by Zenith Data Systems (ZDS) in the early 1980s.

Description 
The Zenith Z-89 is based on the Zilog Z80 microprocessor running at 2.048 MHz, and supports the HDOS and CP/M operating systems. The US$2295 Z-89 is integrated in a terminal-like enclosure with a non-detachable keyboard, 12-inch monochrome CRT with a 80x25 screen, 48 KB RAM, and a 5.25" floppy disk drive.

The keyboard is of high build quality and has an unusual number of special purpose keys: REPEAT, ESC, TAB, CAPS, CTRL, SCROLL, RESET, BREAK, BACK SPACE, LINE FEED, DELETE, REPEAT, and two with red and blue squares. There are five function keys and a numeric keypad. The video display has reverse video and block graphics are available.

The computer has two small card cages inside the cabinet on either side of the CRT, each of which accept up to three proprietary circuit cards. Upgrade cards available for this included disk controller cards (see below), a 16 KB RAM card that upgrades the standard 48 KB RAM to 64 KB, a RAM memory card accessible as a ramdrive using a special driver (above the Z80's 64 KB memory limit) and a multi-serial card providing extra RS-232 ports. The 2 MHz Z80 could be upgraded to 4 MHz. 

In 1979, prior to Zenith's purchase of Heath Company, Heathkit designed and marketed this computer in kit form as the Heath H89, assembled as the WH89, and without the floppy but with a cassette interface card as the H88. (Prior to the Zenith purchase, the Heathkit model numbers did not include the dash).

Heath/Zenith also made a serial terminal, the H19/Z-19, based on the same enclosure (with a blank cover over the diskette drive cut-out) and terminal controller. The company offered an upgrade kit to convert the terminal into a full H89/Z-89 computer.

Another configuration, the Z-90, changes the floppy drive controller from the hard-sectored controller (max 100 kB) to a soft-sectored controller that supported double-sided, double density, 96 tpi drives with a capacity of 800 kB. It also came standard with 64 KB of RAM.

There were several external drive systems available for the H89/Z-89.

 The H77/Z-77 and H87/Z-87 supports up to two additional Single-Sided, Single Density, 48 tpi 5.25" drives.  When connected to the standard hard-sectored controller, it stores 100 kB per floppy. By connecting it to a soft-sectored controller, it stores 200 kB per floppy. 
 The H37/Z-37 supports up to two Double-Sided, Double Density, 96 tpi 5.25" drives and requires the soft-sectored controller. The drive has a capacity of 800 kB. 
 The Z-47 supports two 8" floppy drives and requires its own controller. It uses standard IBM 3740 floppy disks with has a capacity of 1.2 MB each.
 The Z-67 is a 10 MB Winchester Drive plus one 8" floppy drive and also requires its own controller.
 In France, the Heath/Zenith Data System branch connected the 10 MB removable cartridge hard disk, manufactured by Bull in Belfort

A maximum of two disk controller cards can be installed in a standard system.

Reception 
Creative Computing described the Heath H89 as "the most professional looking" microcomputer available. Stating that the computer was "one of the finest" available for less than $3000, the magazine predicted that it "can have a major impact on the small computer market" if good software became available for it. BYTE wrote that the H89 "has a number of unique hardware features and the same excellent software support and documentation as the original H-8 system".

Summary

References 

Notes
 Inflation Conversion Factors for Dollars

External links

Reference and description 
 obsoletecomputermuseum.org/zenith/
 Classic Heathkit Computers and Heathkit H89 Emulators in Javascript (online) and C++
 old-computers.com
 Connecting a virtual diskette drive to the H89 
 Actual scanned Heathkit/Zenith Catalogs with much more information

Emulators 
 Github project page for the Virtual H89 emulator

Zenith
8-bit computers
Zenith Data Systems
Z80-based computers